Giles B. Harber (1849 – December 29, 1925) was a rear admiral of the United States Navy and one-time Commander-in-Chief of both the United States Atlantic Fleet and the Pacific Fleet. He was born and died in Youngstown, Ohio. He was a decorated by Congress for his role in the Spanish–American War.

References

Further reading

External links
 
 The Papers of Giles B. Harper on the "Jeannette" at Dartmouth College Library

1849 births
1925 deaths
American military personnel of the Spanish–American War
People from Youngstown, Ohio
United States Navy admirals